Edward Howard "Ty" Coon, Jr. (July 26, 1915 – January 9, 1992) was a professional American football player who played as an offensive lineman for two seasons in the National Football League (NFL) with the Brooklyn Dodgers.

References

1915 births
1992 deaths
American football offensive linemen
Brooklyn Dodgers (NFL) players
NC State Wolfpack football players
People from White Plains, New York
People from Watertown, Connecticut